Laureen Ann Harper ( Teskey; born June 23, 1963) is a Canadian graphic designer. She is married to Canada's 22nd prime minister, Stephen Harper.

Life and career
The eldest of three, Laureen Ann Teskey was born in Turner Valley, a rural town southwest of Calgary, to rancher parents who owned an electrical contracting company. Her parents, Barbara and Dennis Teskey, divorced in 1991, after 29 years. After graduating from Oilfields High School, she attended the Southern Alberta Institute of Technology where she studied journalism and photography.

She was first married to New Zealander Neil Fenton from April 1985 to 1988. Teskey joined the Reform Party of Canada in the late 1980s. She met Stephen Harper in 1990 while working for GTO Printing, a computer graphics firm operating in Calgary that helped create professional graphs and tables for Harper's major paper for his master's degree in economics at the University of Calgary. They married on December 11, 1993.

Surname
There was initially confusion in the Canadian media about which surname Laureen Harper uses — at different times, media references to her have called her Teskey, Harper, or Teskey Harper (not hyphenated). She used the name "Laureen Teskey" after her 1993 marriage to Stephen Harper, but after her husband's victory in the 2006 federal election, she began using the name "Laureen Harper" in her public role as a spouse of the Prime Minister.

Campaigning
When her husband ran in the 2006 elections, she campaigned alongside him. She was frequently seen at the podium on behalf of and with her husband.

Public life

She had an active public life while at 24 Sussex Drive. She supported causes such as the National Arts Centre where she was Honorary Gala Chair starting in 2005. She was also an active supporter and campaigner for animal welfare organizations such as the Ottawa Humane Society. She accompanied her husband on international trips, for example the G8, G20 and others. Mrs. Harper hosted the spouses of G8 and G20 leaders in June 2010 in Toronto, Ontario.

She created some controversy when she notified the National Arts Centre on September 24, 2008, that she would not be able to fulfill her role as Honorary Gala chair on October 4. This announcement came  just days after her husband said that rich galas aren't something that resonate with ordinary people. Harper later responded saying that the circumstances of her being unable to attend had nothing to do with her husband's comments.

On June 3, 2013, Harper and Ottawa city councillor Allan Hubley announced a new federal anti-bullying strategy to train approximately 2,400 teenagers across Canada in delivering peer education workshops and presentations against bullying to their fellow students.

See also
 Spouse of the prime minister of Canada

References

External links

 Official biography and photo from the website of the Prime Minister of Canada
 

1963 births
Canadian graphic designers
Living people
People from Calgary
People from Foothills County
Southern Alberta Institute of Technology alumni
Spouses of prime ministers of Canada
Stephen Harper